Antono is an Esperanto masculine given name that is a form of Anthony, as well as a surname. Notable people with this name include the following:

Given name
Antono Refa, fictional character from Babylon 5, played by William Forward

Surname
Amat Antono (born 1958), Indonesian politician
Ian Antono (born Jauw Hian Ling, 1950), Indonesian guitarist and songwriter

See also

Anton (given name)
Anton (surname)
Antona (name)
Antone
Antoni
Antonio
Antonov (surname)
Antony
Antoon

Notes

Masculine given names